Trilogy: Dawn is the sixth studio album from British alternative rock band InMe. The album was released in the UK on 4 May 2015 and was the first instalment of three albums in a trilogy. However, the second instalment, Trilogy: Sentience, as well as the third and final instalment, Trilogy: Quietus were never released. On 2 November 2018, InMe announced they would rather focus on their new album Jumpstart Hope and not on the second and third trilogy albums. This would also be the final album to feature Simon Taylor, before his departure from the band in October 2017.

A video for the song Hymn: Ivory Elder, was released on the band's YouTube page on 23 March 2015. After the album's release, the band also made two more videos for Rapture: Land of the Secret Rose and Amnesty: Bonsai Forest using footage recorded from the Trilogy: Dawn UK Tour. The videos appeared on the band's YouTube page on 29 July 2015 and 1 October 2015 respectively.

The Trilogy
Frontman Dave McPherson states that the original idea to release three thematically linked albums struck him during the recording of the band's 5th album, The Pride, in 2011. Each album will have a different sound and theme. Trilogy: Dawn deals with the concept of birth, youth and childhood and is an alternative rock album.

Track listing

Personnel
Credits are adapted from the album's liner notes.

InMe
Dave McPherson - Vocals, guitars, programming
Greg McPherson - Bass, programming
Si Taylor - Drums, programming
Gazz Marlow - Guitars

Additional performers
Alex Davies - Strings on Trauma: Door Slam Crescendo

Production
Produced, mixed and mastered by Mike Curtis at CDS Studios
Press by Jamie Otsa at Wall of Sound PR
Live bookings by Ian Shaw at TKO Booking Agency
Publishing by AMF Publishing

Packaging
Artwork and layout by Jim Vickers
Photography by Dan Eden

References

2015 albums
InMe albums